The Masonic Temple Building in Denver, Colorado is a Richardsonian Romanesque style building from 1889, designed by Frank E. Edbrooke.  It was listed on the National Register of Historic Places in 1977.

The wealth of the Masons in Denver is evident in the fact that no expense was spared in the siting and construction of the building.

See also
Highlands Masonic Lodge, also NRHP-listed and in Denver

References

Masonic buildings completed in 1889
Buildings and structures in Denver
Masonic buildings in Colorado
Richardsonian Romanesque architecture in Colorado
Clubhouses on the National Register of Historic Places in Colorado
National Register of Historic Places in Denver